Folklorismus is a concept used in folkloristics and ethnology. It was developed by the German ethnologists Hans Moser and Hermann Bausinger, and bears similarities with the concepts of invented tradition and fakelore.

The Serbian folklorist Nemanja Radulovic argued that Slavic Native Faith could be understood as a form of folklorismus.

References

Sources

Fakelore
Folklore studies